The prime minister of the Republic of Namibia is the leader of the Government of Namibia. The prime minister is appointed by the President of Namibia and co-ordinates the work of the Cabinet. They also advise and assist the president in the execution of the functions of government.

Key
Political parties

List of officeholders

See also
Namibia
Politics of Namibia
List of colonial governors of South West Africa
President of Namibia
Vice-President of Namibia
Cabinet of Namibia
Lists of office-holders

References

External links
 World Statesmen – Namibia

1990 establishments in Namibia
Government of Namibia
Namibia
 
Prime Ministers